Bobby Howes (4 August 1895 – 27 April 1972) was a British entertainer who was a leading musical comedy performer in London's West End theatres in the 1930s and 1940s.

Biography 

Born in Battersea, Surrey, his parents were Robert William Howes and Rose Marie Butler. He started his career in revues, but his career was interrupted for the First World War where he soldiered on the Western Front. He suffered a German mustard gas attack but recovered and returned to the stage. He gained a career break-through with the role-reversal comedy Mr. Cinders, based on the Cinderella pantomime, also featuring Binnie Hale, with whom he appeared on many occasions subsequently. He reprised his title role in Mr. Cinders in several different productions. 

In the 1930s, he was with Van Phillips' Four Bright Sparks whose vocalists included Billy Milton.
 Four Bright Sparks recorded at least 60 sides. He was a leading musical comedy performer on the West End in the 1930s and 1940s. 

He continued onstage, including Broadway, and in films until he retired in the late 1960s. One of his most acclaimed roles was as the eponymous lead in Finian's Rainbow when it was revived on Broadway in 1960.
 
He was the father of actress/singer Sally Ann Howes and of Peter Howes, by his marriage to Patricia Malone. He died on 27 April 1972, aged 76, in London, England.

Filmography 
 Elixir do Diabo, O (1964)
 Watch it, Sailor! (1961) – as a Drunk (guest appearance)
 The Good Companions (1957) – as Jimmy Nunn
 Happy Go Lovely (1951) – as Charlie
 Murder in the Footlights (1951)
 The Trojan Brothers (1946) – as Benny Castelli
 Bob's Your Uncle (1942)
 Men With Whips (1939)
 Yes, Madam? (1939) – as Bill Quinton
 Sweet Devil (1938) – as Tony Brent
 Please Teacher (1937) – as Tommy Deacon
 Over the Garden Wall (1934) – as Bunny
 42nd Street singing 'Shuffle off to Buffalo' with Ruby Keeler
 For the Love of Mike (1932) – as Bobby Seymour
 Lord Babs (1932) – as Lord Basil 'Babs' Drayford
 Third Time Lucky (1931) – as Rev. Arthur Fear
 The Guns of Loos (1928) – as Danny
 On with the Dance (1927)

Television 
 Douglas Fairbanks Presents: "Point of View" – US airdate 14 May 1956 – episode 4.14[131] – Filmed at the British National Studios, Elstree, England
 Curtains For Harry (1955) – as Harry Bates – single episode show
 Out of This World (1950) – Proposed series that had only one episode, 15 November 1950, Wed 8.30 pm
 Such Is Life (1950) – played 'the little man struggling with his conscience' in this themed sketch series. 5 episodes, 30 mins each, 24 Apr-19 June 1950 – fortnightly Mon around 9 pm
 Paging You (1946) – episode No. 4

Theatre 

 Do Re Me (1961) – Prince of Wales Theatre, London – Opened 12 October 1961
 Finian's Rainbow (1961) – Blackpool Opera House, UK – March/April 1961
 Finian's Rainbow (1960) – Broadway – (revival performance) 23 May 1960 – 1 June 1960
 The Geese Are Getting Fat (1960) – Phoenix Theatre – 1960
 Finian's Rainbow (1958) – New Shakespeare Theatre, Liverpool – with Shani Wallis
 Hide and Seek (1958) – London Hippodrome – with Cicely Courtneidge
 The Entertainer (1958) – Leeds Grand Theatre & Opera House – July 1958
 Start From Scratch (1957) – Q Theatre, Kew (1956–1957 season) – with Glyn Dearman, Helen Christie; dir:Robert Henderson
 Paint Your Wagon (1953) – at Her Majesty's Theatre, The Haymarket – with daughter Sally Ann Howes – production ran for 18 months
 Harvey (1950's?) – Streatham Hill Theatre – 1950's?
 The Yellow Mask (1953) – His Majesty's Theatre
 Roundabout (1949) – three weeks, with Pat Kirkwood
 Four, Five, Six (1948) – with Binnie Hale
 The Man in the Street (1947) – St. James Theatre, October 1947
 Here Come The Boys (1946) – Saville Theatre, Shaftesbury Avenue – with Jack Hulbert
 Cinderella (1944) (pantomime) – Winter Garden
 By Jupiter (1944) – Palace Theatre, Manchester – show opened 25 July, closed quickly
 Let's Face It! (Jerry Walker) – (1942) (musical) – London Hippodrome – show opened 19 November – 348 performances
 Shepherd's Pie (1941) (musical) – Leeds Grand Theatre & Opera House – April 1941, with Arthur Riscoe, Richard Hearne, Vera Pearce and Raymond Newell
 Halfway To Heaven (1940s) – Shaftesbury Theatre – A New Play by Harry Segall.  With Bobby Howes, Bryan Matheson, J H Roberts, Maxwell Foster
 Big Business (1940) – London Hippodrome
 All Clear (1939) – Queen's Theatre, London, with Beatrice Lillie – revue that opened on 20 December 1939
 Bobby Get Your Gun (1938) – Adelphi Theatre – Opened 7 October 1938
 Hide and Seek (1937) – London Hippodrome – show opened 14 October – with Cicely Courtneidge
 Please Teacher (1936) – London Hippodrome
 Christmas Mails 100 Years Ago (1935) – a comedic philatelic play by Nevile Stocken
 Yes Madam? (1934) – London Hippodrome – show opened 27 September – with Binnie Hale
 He Wanted Adventure (Bobby Bramstone) – Saville Theatre – 1933
 Tell Her The Truth (Bobbie) – Saville Theatre – show opened 14 June 1932, 234 performances
 For The Love of Mike (1931) – Saville Theatre
 The Song of the Drum (Chips) – Theatre Royal, Drury Lane – 1931
 Nippy (1930) – London Hippodrome – with Binnie Hale – 1930
 Sons O' Guns (1930) – London Hippodrome – show opened 26 June 1930.
 Mr. Cinders (1930) – Streatham Hill Theatre – April 1930
 Mr. Cinders (1929) – Adelphi Theatre, London – 528 performances
 Mr. Cinders (1928–1929) – London Hippodrome – with Binnie Hale, Ruth Maitland, Arthur Chesney
 The Blue Train (1927) – Prince of Wales Theatre – 10 May 1927
 The Midnight Follies (bathing chorus) (1925) – Metropole – with Enid Stamp-Taylor and Eddie Childs
 Little Revues (1923–24) – West End
 Seasoned To Taste (1919–1920) – a burlesque written by Jack Hylton as a vehicle for Tommy Handley and Howes, which opened at the end of 1919 and ran until early 1920, at the Metropolitan, Edgware Road.

Other live performances 
 Royal Variety Command Performance – 7 November 1955, Victoria Palace
 A gala revue at Theatre Royal, Drury Lane to promote National Savings – 17 October 1948.
 R.A.F.A. Festival of Reunion – Sunday 22 September 1946 – Royal Albert Hall

Discography 
 Finian's Rainbow (1960)
 Paint Your Wagon (1953)
 She's My Lovely (1940s?)
 Yes, Madam (1934) – with Binnie Hale
 "I'm a One-man Girl" – with Binnie Hale, 78 from Mr. Cinders
 The Blue Train (1927)
 Rudolf Friml in London (1923–30) – Derek Oldham, Edith Day, Ethel Levey, Bobby Howes, Roy Royston, Dennis Kings, et al., from 78s.

Product endorsements 
 Ardath Cigarette Cards, No. 28 of 50. Issued by Ardath Tobacco Co. in England.
 British Film Stars cigarette cards issued in England by W.A. & A.C. Churchman in 1934.  He was card No. 14.

References

External links 
 
 BBC profile
 He Wanted Adventure – Show details

1895 births
1972 deaths
English male film actors
English male musical theatre actors
People from Battersea
20th-century English male actors
20th-century English singers
20th-century British male singers